Wu Jin (9 April 1934 – 14 January 2008) was a Taiwanese educator and politician who served as Minister for Education between 1996 and 1998 under president Lee Teng-hui.

Early life
Wu obtained his doctorate in mechanics and hydraulics from the University of Iowa, in Iowa City, Iowa, U.S.. He was a research fellow at the Academia Sinica in 1986.

Wu also served as the first president of the National Cheng Kung University (NCKU) in Tainan, Taiwan.

Minister for Education
Wu was selected by President Lee Teng-hui to serve as Taiwan's education minister in June 1996. 
He was known for his progressive views on the reforms needed in Taiwan's educational system.

Wu stepped down as Minister for Education in February 1998. His resignation was due to a difference of opinion dispute between himself and the president of Academia Sinica, Lee Yuan-tseh, over the pace and types of educational reforms needed. (Lee Yuan-tseh had previously chaired a panel force in the 1980s which had led to a number of changes concerning education in Taiwan.)

Death
Wu Jin was diagnosed with cancer of the ampulla of Vater, a rare form of the disease, in 2006.  
He received treatment at the National Cheng Kung University Hospital in Taiwan and the United States.

Wu's health began to deteriorate in December, 2007 following a trip to Mainland China. He died on Monday, 14 January 2008, at National Cheng Kung University Hospital in Tainan, Taiwan, at the age of 74. Wu was survived by his wife.  His funeral took place in Tainan on 27 January 2008.

References

1934 births
2008 deaths
Taiwanese educators
University of Iowa alumni
Taiwanese Ministers of Education
Deaths from cancer in Taiwan
Place of birth missing
Politicians from Zhenjiang
Members of Academia Sinica
Republic of China politicians from Jiangsu
Academic staff of the National Cheng Kung University
Educators from Zhenjiang
Presidents of universities and colleges in Taiwan
Taiwanese people from Jiangsu